Mecynargus is a genus of dwarf spiders that was first described by C. Chyzer & Władysław Kulczyński in 1894.

Species
 it contains fifteen species:
Mecynargus asiaticus Tanasevitch, 1989 – Kyrgyzstan
Mecynargus borealis (Jackson, 1930) – Canada, Northern Europe, Russia (Siberia)
Mecynargus brocchus (L. Koch, 1872) – Europe
Mecynargus hypnicola Eskov, 1988 – Russia
Mecynargus longus (Kulczyński, 1882) (type) – Eastern Europe
Mecynargus minutipalpis Gnelitsa, 2011 – Ukraine, Russia
Mecynargus minutus Tanasevitch, 2013 – Russia
Mecynargus monticola (Holm, 1943) – Sweden, Finland, Russia, Mongolia, Canada
Mecynargus morulus (O. Pickard-Cambridge, 1873) – Greenland, Palearctic
Mecynargus paetulus (O. Pickard-Cambridge, 1875) – USA (Alaska), Canada, Europe, Russia (European to Far East)
Mecynargus pinipumilis Eskov, 1988 – Russia
Mecynargus pyrenaeus (Denis, 1950) – France
Mecynargus sphagnicola (Holm, 1939) – Greenland, Scandinavia, Russia, Mongolia, Canada
Mecynargus tundricola Eskov, 1988 – Russia (Europe, Siberia)
Mecynargus tungusicus (Eskov, 1981) – Russia, Kyrgyzstan, China, Canada

See also
 List of Linyphiidae species (I–P)

References

Araneomorphae genera
Linyphiidae
Spiders of Asia
Spiders of North America